is a Japanese politician of the Liberal Democratic Party, a member of the House of Representatives in the Diet (national legislature) until 2021, when he lost his seat. A native of Sabae, Fukui and graduate of Hosei University, he was elected to the first of his two terms in the assembly of Fukui Prefecture in 1983 and then to the House of Representatives for the first time in 1990. After losing his seat in 1996, he ran unsuccessfully for the governorship of Fukui Prefecture in 1999. He was re-elected to the House of Representatives in 2003.

Personal life 
He married Sanae Takaichi, a fellow member of the House of Representatives, in 2004. They agreed to a divorce in July 2017, with Takaichi citing differing political views and aspirations as the reason for the divorce. However, they rekindle their marriage in December 2021. His eldest son serves as a prefectural assembly member in Fukui.

References

External links
 Official website in Japanese.

|-

|-

|-

1952 births
Living people
People from Sabae, Fukui
Politicians from Fukui Prefecture
Spouses of Japanese politicians
Members of the House of Representatives (Japan)
Liberal Democratic Party (Japan) politicians
Hosei University alumni
21st-century Japanese politicians